Băilești is a city in Dolj County, Oltenia, Romania, with a population of 17,537. One village, Balasan, is administered by the city.

The Romanian actor and comedian Amza Pellea and Romanian actor and theatre actor Marcel Iureș were born here and also Adriana Nechita, Georgiana Ciuciulete, and Valerică Găman.

History

During World War I, 156 people from Băilești died on the battlefield; in 1924 sculptor Iordănescu constructed the Monument of the Băilești Heroes in their honor.  During World War II, 108 citizens of Băilești died on the battlefield.

In 2001, Băilești was declared a municipality. The city has been expanding during the past few years; several commercial centers have been built, while banks and old buildings have been restored.

References

External links

Populated places in Dolj County
Localities in Oltenia
Cities in Romania